The 1999 Oceania Club Championships was held in September 1999. The tournament was designed to decide the Oceania Football Confederation's entrant into the 2000 FIFA Club World Championship.  The competition was held in Fiji (Nadi and Lautoka).

Teams
A total of 9 teams from 9 OFC member associations entered the competition.

Group stage

The nine participants were placed in three groups, where each team played the other teams once. The group winners and best second place team progressed to the semi-finals.

Group A

Group B

Group C

Knockout phase

Semi-finals
The top team from each groups progressed to the semifinals, along with the best second place team.

Third place play-off

The third place playoff was cancelled due to injuries following in particular the Central United vs Tafea match.

Final

Champion

South Melbourne are the 1999 Oceania Club Champions and qualify for the 2000 FIFA Club World Championship.

External links
OFC Club Championship 1999 site

Oceania Club Championship
Club Championship, 1999
1998–99 in OFC football
1999 in Oceanian sport
1999
Oceania Club Championship, 1999